Ivan Salaj (10 May 1961 – 6 January 2020) was a Serbian professional basketball player.

Playing career 
A power forward, Salaj played 22 seasons in Yugoslavia from 1977 to 1999. During his playing days, he played for KK 25. Maj (Srem from the 1990s) on two occasions, Crvena zvezda, Borovo, and Mitrovčani. He retired as a player with his hometown club Mitrovčani in 1999.

During his tenure with Crvena zveda of the Yugoslav Federal League from 1978 to 1983, he was a part of the talented cast along with Slobodan Nikolić, Predrag Bogosavljev, Zufer Avdija,  Boban Janković, Stevan Karadžić, and Branko Kovačević. Over 119 games in 5 seasons with the Zvezda, he averaged 2.4 points per game.

See also 
 List of KK Crvena zvezda players with 100 games played

References

1961 births
2020 deaths
Centers (basketball)
KK Crvena zvezda players
KK Srem players
Sportspeople from Sremska Mitrovica
Power forwards (basketball)
Serbian expatriate sportspeople in Croatia
Serbian men's basketball players
Yugoslav men's basketball players